The lieutenant governor of Florida is a statewide constitutional office in the executive branch of the U.S. state of Florida. It is the second highest-ranking official in the state government. The lieutenant governor is elected on a ticket with the governor for a four-year term. 

Official duties dictated to the lieutenant governor under the present Florida Constitution are to serve as the acting governor in the absence of the governor from the state or the disability of the governor, or to become governor in the event of the governor's death, resignation or removal from office via impeachment.

Jeanette Nuñez is the 20th and current lieutenant governor of Florida, in office since January 2019 under Ron DeSantis.

History
The position of lieutenant governor has been used in Florida's government twice in the state's history. The first period spanned from 1865, after the American Civil War, through 1889. During this time, the lieutenant governor was elected independently of the governor. In addition to being first in succession to the governor, the lieutenant governor was the ex officio president of the Florida Senate, and could cast a vote in the case of a tie. William W. J. Kelly was the first person elected lieutenant governor after the position was created by the 1865 Constitution of Florida. The position was officially abolished by the post-Reconstruction Constitution of 1885, with the last lieutenant governor, Milton H. Mabry, serving out his term until 1889. After this point the office of President of the Senate was given to an elected member of the Senate, who also served as first in line of succession to the governor.

The current Florida Constitution of 1968 recreated the office of lieutenant governor who is now elected directly along with the governor as a running mate. The lieutenant governor serves as first in the line of succession, but the office of President of the Senate remains with an elected senator. The lieutenant governor has a few prescribed duties and otherwise assists the governor with the duties of the executive branch. The first lieutenant governor under the current Constitution was Ray C. Osborne, who took office in 1969.

The state constitution also forbids anyone from being elected lieutenant governor more than twice.

List of lieutenant governors
Parties

{| class="wikitable unsortable"
!  !! Name !! Image !! Took office !! Left office !! Party!! Governor!! Notes
|- 
|1
| William W. J. Kelly
| 
| December 20, 1865
| July 4, 1868
| Republican
| David S. Walker
|
|- 
| 2
| William Henry Gleason
| 
| July 7, 1868
| December 14, 1868
| Republican
| rowspan=3 | Harrison Reed
|
|- 
| 3
| Edmund C. Weeks
| 
| January 24, 1870
| December 27, 1870
| Republican
|
|- 
| 4
| Samuel T. Day
| 
| January 3, 1871
| June 3, 1872
| Republican
| 
|- 
| 5
| Marcellus Stearns
| 
| January 7, 1873
| March 18, 1874
| Republican
| Ossian B. Hart
| Became governor upon the death of O. B. Hart
|- 
| 6
| Noble A. Hull
| 
| January 2, 1877
| March 3, 1879
| Democratic
| George Franklin Drew
| Resigned to become a U.S. Representative
|- 
| 7
| Livingston W. Bethel
| 
| January 4, 1881
| January 7, 1885
| Democratic
| William D. Bloxham
|
|- 
| 8
| Milton H. Mabry
| 
| January 7, 1885
| January 8, 1889
| Democratic
| Edward A. Perry
|
|-
! colspan=8 | The position of Lieutenant Governor of Florida was abolished in 1889 in the Constitution of 1885. It was reestablished in 1969 following a constitutional amendment in 1968.
|- 
| 9
| Ray C. Osborne
| 
| January 7, 1969
| January 5, 1971
| Republican
| Claude R. Kirk, Jr.
|
|- 
| 10
| Tom Adams
| 
| January 5, 1971
| January 7, 1975
| Democratic
| rowspan=2 | Reubin O'Donovan Askew
|
|- 
| 11
| Jim Williams
| 
| January 7, 1975
| January 2, 1979
| Democratic
|
|- 
| 12
| Wayne Mixson
| 
| January 2, 1979
| January 3, 1987
| Democratic
| Bob Graham
| Became governor upon the resignation of Bob Graham
|- 
| 13
| Bobby Brantley
| 
| January 6, 1987
| January 8, 1991
| Republican
| Bob Martinez
|
|- 
| 14
| Buddy MacKay
| 
| January 8, 1991
| December 12, 1998
| Democratic
| Lawton Chiles
| Became governor upon the death of Lawton Chiles
|- 
| 15
| Frank Brogan
| 
| January 5, 1999
| March 3, 2003
| Republican  Jeb Bush
| Resigned to become President of Florida Atlantic University
|- 
| 16
| Toni Jennings
| 
| March 3, 2003
| January 2, 2007
| Republican
| Appointed to replace Brogan
|- 
| 17
| Jeff Kottkamp
| 
| January 2, 2007
| January 4, 2011
| Republican
| Charlie Crist
| 
|- 
| 18
| Jennifer Carroll
| 
| January 4, 2011
| March 12, 2013
| Republican  Rick Scott
| Resigned
|- 
| 19
| Carlos Lopez-Cantera
| 
| February 3, 2014
| January 7, 2019
| Republican
| Appointed to replace Carroll
|- 
| 20
| Jeanette Nuñez 
| 
| January 8, 2019
| present
| Republican
| Ron DeSantis 
| 
|}

List of acting lieutenant governors
Parties

See also
Florida
Florida Constitution
Florida Democratic Party
Florida State Capitol
List of governors of Florida
List of current United States Lieutenant Governors
Republican Party of Florida

References

External links
Manuscript Collections of Florida Lieutenant Governors
The Political Graveyard: Florida: Lieutenant Governors